Alfei Menashe (lit. Thousands of Manasseh) is an Israeli settlement on the western edge of the central West Bank. Built over land confiscated from the nearby Palestinian villages of Nabi Ilyas, Islah, and Ras Atiya, it is located in the so-called seam zone of the West Bank. Its name is taken from the bible (Deuteronomy 33:17). It was granted local council status in 1987.

The international community considers Israeli settlements in the West Bank illegal under international law, but the Israeli government disputes this.

History
According to ARIJ, Israel confiscated land from several Palestinian villages in order to construct Alfei Menashe:
 1,943 dunums of land (43.8% of the total village lands) was taken from Nabi Ilyas,
 651 dunums of land were taken from ‘Arab Abu Farda,
 131  dunums of land were taken from Islah,
 51 dunes were taken from Ras Atiya.

In September 2005, Israel's Supreme Court ruled that the government must consider re-routing the barrier in this area. Work was begun in the summer of 2009 to construct a new route for the barrier, which will no longer incorporate the Palestinian village of Ras al-Tira (and several other villages) on the Israeli side. The work was finished in 2011. (source: Google Earth)

The settlement is the hometown of Israel's most successful mixed martial artist Noad Lahat.

References

External links
Official website 

Mixed Israeli settlements
Local councils in Israel
Populated places established in 1983
1983 establishments in the Palestinian territories
Israeli settlements in the West Bank